Neuburgweier is a part of the city Rheinstetten, which was first established as a municipality in the course of an administrative reform in 1975.

Following places border on Neuburgweier: Forchheim, Mörsch, Au am Rhein and on the other side of the Rhine, Neuburg am Rhein.

Local Geography 

To the west of Neuburgweier is the Rhine which forms the natural border to Rhineland-Palatinate. The riparian woodlands in the area are designated nature reserves. In the area surrounding Neuburgweier is also a large, former gravel pit. The gravel pit, which is naturally filled with water, is now called  and is used for swimming and fishing.

The Federbach flows through Neuburgweier. The nature reserve Kunzenbach borders on the nature reserve of Neburgweier.

Size and Population 
Neuburgweier has about 2,500 residents and is about 385 hectares large. Neuburgweier is the smallest one of all three city districts of Rheinstetten.

History 

In 1592, Neuburg am Rhein ended up westward of the Rhine through a modification of the river course. Since then Neuburg am Rhein and Neuburgweier have been geographically separated. It is assumed that Neuburg am Rhein was founded in 1100 by the diocese of Speyer to secure a place to cross the river.

Today, there is a ferry between Neuburgweier and Neuburg am Rhein, also known under the name of "'Baden-Pfalz' Fähre".

References

External links 

 Geschichte von ganz Rheinstetten

Former municipalities in Baden-Württemberg
Karlsruhe (district)
Populated places on the Rhine